John Greenhill (c. 1644 – 19 May 1676) was an English portrait painter, a pupil of Peter Lely, who approached his teacher in artistic excellence, but whose life was cut short by a dissolute lifestyle.

Life and work
Greenhill was born at Salisbury, Wiltshire around 1644, the eldest son of John Greenhill, registrar of the diocese of Salisbury, and Penelope Champneys, daughter of Richard Champneys of Orchardleigh, Somerset. His father was connected through his brothers with the East India trade. John's younger brother Henry became Governor of the Gold Coast and a commissioner of the Navy.

Greenhill was educated at Salisbury Cathedral School. His first attempt at a portrait was one of his paternal uncle James Abbott of Salisbury, whom he is said to have sketched surreptitiously, as the old man would not sit for him. About 1662 he moved to London and became a pupil of Peter Lely. His progress was rapid, and he acquired some of Lely's skill and method. He carefully studied Vandyck's portraits, and George Vertue commented that he copied so closely Vandyck's portrait of "Thomas Killigrew and his dog" that it was difficult to know which was the original. Vertue also says that his progress excited Lely's jealousy.

Greenhill was at first industrious, and married early. But a taste for poetry and drama, and living in Covent Garden in the vicinity of the theatres, led him to associate with many members of the free-living theatrical world, and he fell into "irregular habits". On 19 May 1676, while returning from the Vine Tavern (in Holborn) in a state of intoxication, he fell into the gutter in Long Acre, and was carried to his lodgings in Lincoln's Inn Fields, where he died the same night. He was buried in St Giles in the Fields church. He left a widow and family, to whom Lely gave an annuity.

Among Greenhill's personal admirers was dramatist Aphra Behn, who kept up an amorous correspondence with him, and lamented his early death in a fulsome panegyric.

Portraits

Greenhill's portraits are of great merit, often approaching those of Lely in excellence. Among his chief sitters were Bishop Seth Ward, in the Guildhall at Salisbury, painted in 1673; Anthony Ashley Cooper, 1st Earl of Shaftesbury, painted more than once during his chancellorship in 1672 (engraved by Abraham Blooteling); John Locke, who wrote some verses in Greenhill's praise (engraved by Pieter van Gunst); Sir William D'Avenant (engraved by William Faithorne); Philip Woolrich (engraved in mezzotint by Francis Place); poet Abraham Cowley, Admiral Edward Spragge and others.

Greenhill painted a self-portrait, now hanging in the Dulwich Picture Gallery in London (engraved in Wornum's edition of Horace Walpole's "Anecdotes of Painting"). He also drew a portrait of himself, as did Lely.

References

External links

John Greenhill online (ArtCyclopedia)
John Greenhill on Artnet
Portraits by John Greenhill (National Portrait Gallery, London)
Drawing of John Locke (Peter Mould Fine paintings)

1676 deaths
17th-century English painters
English male painters
English portrait painters
People educated at Salisbury Cathedral School
People from Salisbury
Year of birth uncertain